HD 52265 is a 6th-magnitude G-type main sequence star located approximately 98 light-years away in the constellation of Monoceros. It is 21% more massive than and more than twice as luminous as the Sun. The age of the star is roughly 2.6 billion years. The star HD 52265 is named Citalá. The name was selected in the NameExoWorlds campaign by El Salvador, during the 100th anniversary of the IAU. Citalá means River of stars in the native Nahuat language.

Planetary system
In 2000 the California and Carnegie Planet Search team announced the discovery of an extrasolar planet orbiting the star. It was independently discovered by the Geneva Extrasolar Planet Search team. The second planet in the system is suspected since 2013.

See also
 List of extrasolar planets

References

External links
 
 Wobbly, Sunlike Star Being Pulled by Giant Alien Planet, Charles Q. Choi

G-type main-sequence stars
052265
033719
Monoceros (constellation)
Planetary systems with one confirmed planet
Durchmusterung objects
2622